The Vs. Tour was a concert tour by the American rock band Pearl Jam to support its second album, Vs.

History
Pearl Jam promoted Vs. with tours in the United States in the fall of 1993 and the spring of 1994. The fall 1993 tour focused on the Western United States, while the spring 1994 tour focused on the Eastern United States. Industry insiders compared Pearl Jam's tour to the touring habits of Led Zeppelin, in that the band "ignored the press and took its music directly to the fans." During this tour the band set a cap on ticket prices in the attempt to thwart scalpers.

During the tour Pearl Jam concurrently worked on its third album. Several songs from the band's third album, Vitalogy, were premiered during this tour. These include "Last Exit", "Spin the Black Circle", "Not for You", "Tremor Christ", "Nothingman", "Whipping", "Corduroy", "Satan's Bed", "Better Man", and "Immortality".

On the evening of November 5, 1993, Pearl Jam performed before almost 25,000 fans that stood and sat through the night on the lawns of Indio, California previously rock-festival free Empire Polo Club. (This show is well known among fans because halfway through the set, fans in the pit began pelting the band with shoes, provoking Vedder and the band to walk off stage, only to come out and play the rest of the set from behind a wall of speakers.) Although band management had chosen this untested and under-developed site as part of a boycott of Ticketmaster and the Southern California auditoriums it controlled, the event established the new venue's suitability for large-scale rock events. Pearl Jam's November 30, 1993 concert in Las Vegas at the Aladdin Theatre for the Performing Arts featured a reunion by the grunge band Green River. Participating in the reunion were Pearl Jam members Jeff Ament and Stone Gossard, Mudhoney members Mark Arm and Steve Turner, and Chuck Treece, who filled in on drums for Green River drummer Alex Vincent.

Pearl Jam was outraged when it discovered after a pair of shows in Chicago in March 1994 that ticket vendor Ticketmaster had added a service charge to the tickets. The band's April 3, 1994 concert in Atlanta at the Fox Theatre was broadcast live on the radio in the United States and was also eventually released as a part of the "Dissident"/Live in Atlanta box set released in Europe. On April 8, 1994, Nirvana frontman Kurt Cobain was found dead in his home in Seattle due to an apparent suicide, which deeply affected Pearl Jam vocalist Eddie Vedder. At the band's April 8, 1994 concert in Fairfax, Virginia at the Patriot Center, Vedder proclaimed, "I don't think any of us would be in this room tonight if it weren't for Kurt Cobain." Vedder later said that "the day that we found out about Kurt...I was just spinning. I was lost and didn't know if we should play, or if we should just go home, or if we should attend the services. I still have some regrets about that, even though in the end it was probably better that we played the last two weeks of the tour. I decided I would play those next two weeks and then I'd never have to play again." This was Pearl Jam's last tour with drummer Dave Abbruzzese.

Following the tour, the band brought a lawsuit against Ticketmaster that accused them of being a monopoly whose anticompetitive practices allowed markup prices of more than 30%. The band's intention was to get ticket prices lowered for its fans. Pearl Jam's plans for a 1994 summer tour were cancelled as a result of a Ticketmaster boycott.

Tour dates
Information taken from various sources.

Cancellations and rescheduled shows

Band members
Jeff Ament – bass guitar
Stone Gossard – rhythm guitar
Mike McCready – lead guitar
Eddie Vedder – lead vocals, guitar
Dave Abbruzzese – drums

Songs performed

Originals
"Alive"
"Alone"
"Angel"
"Animal"
"Better Man"
"Black"
"Blood"
"Breath"
"Corduroy"
"Daughter"
"Deep"
"Dirty Frank"
"Dissident"
"Elderly Woman Behind the Counter in a Small Town"
"Even Flow"
"Footsteps"
"Fuck Me in the Brain"
"Garden"
"Glorified G"
"Go"
"Hard to Imagine"
"Immortality"
"Indifference"
"Jeremy"
"Last Exit"
"Leash"
"Not for You"
"Nothingman"
"Oceans"
"Once"
"Out of My Mind"
"Porch"
"Rats"
"Rearviewmirror"
"Release"
"Satan's Bed"
"Spin the Black Circle"
"State of Love and Trust"
"Tremor Christ"
"W.M.A."
"Wash"
"Whipping"
"Why Go"
"Yellow Ledbetter"

Covers
"Across the Universe" (The Beatles) (snippet)
"Ain't Nothing to Do" (Dead Boys)
"American Pie" (Don McLean) (snippet)
"Androgynous Mind" (Sonic Youth) (snippet)
"Another Brick in the Wall" (Pink Floyd) (snippet)
"Baba O'Riley" (The Who)
"Beginning to See the Light" (The Velvet Underground) (snippet)
"Crazy Mary" (Victoria Williams)
"Fuckin' Up" (Neil Young)
"Golden Years" (David Bowie) (snippet)
"Happy Birthday" (traditional)
"Happy Trails" (Dale Evans)
"Hate the Police" (The Dicks) (snippet)
"Hey Hey, My My (Into the Black)" (Neil Young) (snippet)
"I Am a Patriot" (Steven Van Zandt)
"I Won't Back Down" (Tom Petty)
"I'm One" (The Who)
"I've Got a Feeling" (The Beatles)
"Instant Karma!" (John Lennon) (snippet)
"The Kids Are Alright" (The Who)
"Monkey Gone to Heaven" (Pixies) (snippet)
"My Generation" (The Who)
"The Real Me" (The Who) (snippet)
"Rockin' in the Free World" (Neil Young)
"Sail Away" (Neil Young) (snippet)
"Sheraton Gibson" (Pete Townshend)
"Shine" (Rollins Band) (snippet)
"Sick o' Pussies" (Bad Radio) (snippet)
"(Sittin' On) The Dock of the Bay" (Otis Redding)
"Sonic Reducer" (Dead Boys)
"Street Fighting Man" (The Rolling Stones)
"Suck You Dry" (Mudhoney) (snippet)
"Suspicious Minds" (Elvis Presley) (snippet)
"Swallow My Pride" (Green River)
"Sweet Emotion" (Aerosmith) (snippet)
"Tearing" (Rollins Band) (snippet)
"Three Little Birds" (Bob Marley and the Wailers)
"Throw Your Arms Around Me" (Hunters & Collectors)
"Tonight's the Night" (Neil Young) (snippet)
"Young Man Blues" (Mose Allison) (snippet)

References

1993 concert tours
Pearl Jam concert tours